The term Hoffman device may refer to:

 The Hoffman external lengthening fixator, a prosthetic limb device
 The Hoffman tank gunfire simulator, a tank gunfire simulator.